Mackenzie Stadium is a baseball venue located in Holyoke, Massachusetts.  It was home to the Holyoke Millers and today is used by both the Valley Blue Sox of the New England Collegiate Baseball League (since 2008) and the Elms College Blazers of the New England Collegiate Conference (since 2005).  It was built in 1933 and has a capacity of 4,100 people.

Mackenzie Stadium hosted the 2009 NECBL All-Star Game on July 18, 2009.  The game, attended by an All-Star Game record 4,906 fans, was won by the host West Division 6–5.

Former tenants
The stadium was the home of the Holyoke Millers of the Double-A Eastern League for six seasons between 1977 and 1982.  The Millers were Eastern League champions in 1980.  Following the 1982 season, the franchise moved to Nashua, New Hampshire and became the Nashua Angels.  The franchise still exists today as the Harrisburg Senators, Double-A affiliate of the Washington Nationals.

Mackenzie was also home to the Holyoke Giants of the New England Collegiate Baseball League from 2004 to 2007 until the team moved to Lynn, Massachusetts and became the North Shore Navigators.

Field dedication
The stadium is named after Medal of Honor recipient John Mackenzie.

NECBL attendance
The following is a list of the attendance figures of the two NECBL franchises to play at Mackenzie Stadium, the Holyoke Giants (2004–2007) and Valley Blue Sox (2008–present).  In 2011, the Blue Sox led the NECBL in attendance for the first time.

Photo gallery

References

External links
 Holyoke Blue Sox website
 Elms College baseball website
 NECBL website
 Mackenzie Stadium Photo Gallery at digitalballparks.com

Buildings and structures in Holyoke, Massachusetts
Baseball venues in Massachusetts
Minor league baseball venues
New England Collegiate Baseball League ballparks
1933 establishments in Massachusetts
Sports venues completed in 1933
College baseball venues in the United States
Sports in Holyoke, Massachusetts
Sports venues in Hampden County, Massachusetts